McKees Half Falls is an unincorporated community in Snyder County, in the U.S. state of Pennsylvania.

History
The community was named after Thomas McKee, a pioneer who settled at this site near a waterfall on the Susquehanna River. A variant name is "McKee Half Falls".

References

Unincorporated communities in Pennsylvania
Unincorporated communities in Snyder County, Pennsylvania